Sentry Island (Arvia'juaq) is one of several Canadian arctic islands in Nunavut, Canada within western Hudson Bay. The closest community is Arviat,  to the west.

The island forms part of the Arvia'juaq and Qikiqtaarjuk National Historic Site and a Paallirmiut Inuit summer camp site. Sentry Island is a popular place for fishing and hunting.

History

The island served as a rest stop for Henry Hudson and his crew during his ill-fated journeys to find the Northwest Passage in 1610 - 1611.

On July 3, 2018, a man from Arviat was killed in a rare polar bear attack on the island. The man was on the island with his children when the polar bear approached them and attacked, killing 31-year-old Aaron Gibbons. The bear was killed by two others who were living in the area.

References

Islands of Hudson Bay
Uninhabited islands of Kivalliq Region